United Nations Security Council resolution 766, adopted unanimously on 21 July 1992, after recalling resolutions 668 (1990), 717 (1991), 718 (1991), 728 (1992) and 745 (1992), the Council acknowledged and expressed its concern at the difficulties experienced by the United Nations Transitional Authority in Cambodia (UNTAC) in the implementation of a political settlement in Cambodia signed at the Paris Conference on 23 October 1991.

The Council deplored the continuing violations of the ceasefire in Cambodia, calling on all parties to cease from hostilities immediately and assist in the identification of land mines and in other areas. At the same time, it condemned the refusal by the Party of Democratic Kampuchea to allow the deployment of UNTAC to areas under its control, urging it do so, so that phase two of the United Nations plan can be fully implemented. It reaffirmed the international community's commitment to the political process under UNTAC, urging all parties to respect its peaceful nature and to Member States to provide assistance to the Authority.

The resolution also requested the Secretary-General Boutros Boutros-Ghali to accelerate the deployment of civilian components, especially those involved in the supervision and control of administrative structures. With regard to the lack of co-operation by the Party of Democratic Kampuchea, the Council declared that the benefits of international assistance will only apply to those parties which fulfil their obligations under the Paris agreements. However, in his report, the Secretary-General recognised that the cantonment process of Cambodian soldiers could not fully take place with the support of only three factions.

See also
 List of United Nations Security Council Resolutions 701 to 800 (1991–1993)
 Modern Cambodia
 Transition of the People's Republic of Kampuchea to Cambodia

References

External links
 
Text of the Resolution at undocs.org

 0766
20th century in Cambodia
Political history of Cambodia
 0766
July 1992 events
1992 in Cambodia